Amtrak, officially the National Railroad Passenger Corporation, is a quasi-public entity that operates passenger train services in the United States. Since its inception in 1971, it has had several route changes, contractions, and station replacements that resulted in the closure of older stations.

Closed stations

Proposed / cancelled stations

See also
 List of busiest Amtrak stations
 List of Amtrak stations in California
 List of IATA-indexed train stations
 List of major cities in U.S. lacking Amtrak service
 List of Greyhound Bus stations

Bibliography

References

Former Amtrak stations
Lists of railway stations in the United States
Location codes
Former Amtrak stations in the United States